Gilberto Jerónimo Yearwood (born 15 March 1956) is a Honduran former football player who currently is an Assistant coach of the El Salvador national football team. He is by many regarded as one of Honduras' best players of all time.

Club career
Nicknamed el Vikingo (The Viking), Yearwood has played mostly in defensive midfield and started his career at Real C.D. España in his native country. In 1977, he moved abroad to play in Spain and spent 10 season playing for Elche CF, Real Valladolid, CD Tenerife and Celta de Vigo. He finished his career as a central defender back in Honduras with C.D. Olimpia, F.C. Motagua and C.D. Marathón. His final league match was on 8 May 1994, when he played with Olimpia against Vida.

He scored 20 goals in Liga Nacional: 10 with Real España, 6 with Motagua and 4 for Olimpia.

International career
Yearwood played and scored at the 1977 FIFA World Youth Championship, the inaugural staging of the FIFA World Youth Championship held in Tunisia. He made his senior debut for Honduras in a June 1982 FIFA World Cup match against Spain, which was his country's first ever World Cup match, and has earned a total of at least 46 caps, scoring 1 goal. He has represented his country in 21 FIFA World Cup qualification matches and played at the 1991 and 1993 UNCAF Nations Cups as well as at the 1991 CONCACAF Gold Cup.

His final international was a May 1993 FIFA World Cup qualification match against Mexico.

International goals
Scores and results list Honduras' goal tally first.

Managerial career
As a coach, he has been in charge of Motagua winning his first title, Olimpia, Broncos (with whom he got relegated), Real Maya, Real España and Atlético Olanchano in Honduras as well as Dragón in El Salvador.

He was announced manager of C.D. Marathón in March 2006, later he was sacked by Atlético Olanchano in November 2007 and in 2008 he moved abroad again to take charge of Xinabajul in Guatemala.

He left Xinabajul in September 2010 and became in charge of USAC, with whom he clinched promotion to Guatemala's top tier. In October 2012 he joined Guatemalan second division side Sacachispas after being dismissed by USAC.

Honours and awards

Club
C.D. Real Espana
Liga Profesional de Honduras (2):  1975–76, 1976–77

C.D. Olimpia
Liga Profesional de Honduras (1): 1992–93

Country
Honduras
Copa Centroamericana (1): 1993

References

External links
 La Liga statistics 

1956 births
Living people
People from Cortés Department
Association football midfielders
Honduran footballers
Honduras international footballers
Real C.D. España players
Elche CF players
Real Valladolid players
CD Tenerife players
RC Celta de Vigo players
C.D. Olimpia players
F.C. Motagua players
C.D. Marathón players
La Liga players
Liga Nacional de Fútbol Profesional de Honduras players
Garifuna people
Honduran football managers
Honduran expatriate football managers
F.C. Motagua managers
C.D. Marathón managers
Real C.D. España managers
Universidad SC managers
1982 FIFA World Cup players
1991 CONCACAF Gold Cup players
Honduran expatriate footballers
Honduran expatriate sportspeople in Spain
Expatriate football managers in Guatemala
Honduran expatriate sportspeople in Guatemala